Antimitra is a genus of sea snails, marine gastropod mollusks in the family Colubrariidae.

The genus has become a synonym of Metula H. Adams & A. Adams, 1853.

Species
Species within the genus Antimitra include:
 Antimitra lirata (Adams A., 1865)
Species brought into synonymy 
 Antimitra aegrota (Reeve, 1845): synonym of Metula aegrota (Reeve, 1845)
 Antimitra crenulata (Pease, 1868): synonym of Otitoma cyclophora (Deshayes, 1863)
 Antimitra hewitti Tomlin, 1921: synonym of Mitromorpha hewitti (Tomlin, 1921)
 Antimitra striolata Turton W. H., 1932: synonym of Mitromorpha striolata (Turton W. H., 1932)

References

External links
 Kilburn R.N. (2004) The identities of Otitoma and Antimitra (Mollusca: Gastropoda: Conidae and Buccinidae). African Invertebrates 45: 263-270. NIZT 682 page(s): 269

Colubrariidae